Anthony Joseph Mansolino (born September 28, 1982) is an American professional baseball coach for the Baltimore Orioles of Major League Baseball.

Mansolino attended Vanderbilt University, where he played college baseball for the Vanderbilt Commodores. In 2003, he played collegiate summer baseball with the Yarmouth–Dennis Red Sox of the Cape Cod Baseball League. The Pittsburgh Pirates selected him in the 26th round of the 2005 MLB draft. He played in Minor League Baseball for six seasons before being hired by the Cleveland Indians to serve as the hitting coach for the Mahoning Valley Scrappers. He was the manager for the Lake County Captains in 2016. Mansolino managed the Lynchburg Hillcats in 2017, and was named the Carolina League Manager of the Year. He was promoted to manage the Akron RubberDucks in 2018 and the Columbus Clippers in 2019.

During the 2020 season, Mansolino served as Cleveland's third base coach when Mike Sarbaugh, their third base coach, served as the acting bench coach while Sandy Alomar Jr., the bench coach, filled in as their acting manager while Terry Francona was away from the team with a medical condition. The Orioles hired Mansolino as their third base coach after the 2020 season.

His father, Doug Mansolino, is a former baseball coach.

References

External links

Living people
1982 births
Vanderbilt Commodores baseball players
Yarmouth–Dennis Red Sox players
Clearwater Threshers players
Gulf Coast Pirates players
Hickory Crawdads players
Lynchburg Hillcats players
Reading Phillies players
Schaumburg Flyers players
St. Paul Saints players
Wichita Wingnuts players